Peter May (born  in Enfield) is a British male weightlifter.

Weightlifting career
May competed in the 85 kg category representing England and Great Britain at international competitions. He participated at the 1988 Summer Olympics in the 100 kg event and at the 1992 Summer Olympics in the 90 kg event. He competed at world championships, most recently at the 2003 World Weightlifting Championships.

He represented England and won a bronze medal in the 82.5 kg light-heavyweight, at the 1986 Commonwealth Games in Edinburgh, Scotland. He then won three silver medals representing England, at the 1990 Commonwealth Games in Auckland, New Zealand during an unusual period when three medals were awarded in one category (clean and jerk, snatch and combined) which invariably led to the same athlete winning all three of the same colour medal. He won another three silver medal at the 1994 Commonwealth Games.

Major results

References

External links
 

1966 births
Living people
British male weightlifters
Weightlifters at the 1988 Summer Olympics
Weightlifters at the 1992 Summer Olympics
Olympic weightlifters of Great Britain
People from Enfield, London
Weightlifters at the 1986 Commonwealth Games
Weightlifters at the 1990 Commonwealth Games
Commonwealth Games medallists in weightlifting
Commonwealth Games silver medallists for England
Commonwealth Games bronze medallists for England
20th-century British people
Medallists at the 1986 Commonwealth Games
Medallists at the 1990 Commonwealth Games